Braulio Baeza (born March 26, 1940) is an American Thoroughbred horse racing Hall of Fame jockey and one of the master Thoroughbred jockeys of our time. In 1963, he was the first Latin American jockey to win the Kentucky Derby. Baeza began his racing career in 1955 in Panama at Hipodromo Juan Franco, and in March 1960, was invited to Miami, Florida to ride under contract for Owner/Trainer, Fred Hooper. He rode his first race in the US in the first race on Keeneland's opening day, 1960, and won it on Foolish Youth.

Braulio Baeza's success in America was instantaneous. He was the leading money winner in American racing from 1965 to 1969, the 1968 winner of the George Woolf Memorial Jockey Award, and the 1972 and 1975 winner of the Eclipse Award for Outstanding Jockey. During his career, he rode a number of Thoroughbred greats, including Buckpasser, Graustark, Dr. Fager, and Ack Ack. In 1961, he won his first Belmont Stakes. Two years later, he rode to his first Kentucky Derby victory on Chateaugay, as well as for his second Belmont Stakes win. In 1969, he won the Belmont for the third time, denying Majestic Prince the Triple Crown, on board Paul Mellon's future Hall of Famer, Arts and Letters.

In 1972, Baeza travelled to York Racecourse in England, where he rode John Galbraith's Roberto to victory over the previously unbeaten Brigadier Gerard in the inaugural Benson & Hedges Gold Cup. That same year, he went to Woodbine Racetrack in Toronto, Ontario, Canada, where he won the prestigious Canadian International Stakes on Droll Role for Trainer T. J.Kelly. Baeza was the jockey aboard Foolish Pleasure in the tragic 1975 match race against the great 3-year-old filly Ruffian, who had to be euthanized after she pulled up during the race with a broken front ankle.

Braulio Baeza retired in 1976 after having won 3140 races in the United States. He was inducted that same year into the National Museum of Racing and Hall of Fame.

Triple Crown Record 

Kentucky Derby: 12-1-3-0

Preakness Stakes: 10-0-3-2

Belmont Stakes: 14-3-2-0

References

External links
 Braulio Baeza website

1940 births
American jockeys
American Champion jockeys
American sportspeople of Panamanian descent
Eclipse Award winners
Living people
Panamanian jockeys
Sportspeople from Panama City
United States Thoroughbred Racing Hall of Fame inductees
Panamanian emigrants to the United States